Little Farmer's Cay is an island in the Bahamas, located in the district of Black Point. The island had a population of 66 at the 2010 census. 

Each year, the island hosts the Farmer's Cay First Friday in February Festival, a sailing regatta.

Butterfly species found on the island include the fulvous hairstreak (Electrostrymon angelia), scrub hairstreak (Strymon columella), martial hairstreak (Strymon martialis), long-tailed skipper (Urbanus proteus), broken dash skipper (Wallengrenia misera) and the Gulf fritillary (Agraulis vanillae insularis).

References

Islands of the Bahamas